State Highway 39 is a State Highway in Rajasthan state of India that connects Satur in Bundi district of Rajasthan with Mundwa in Nagaur district of Rajasthan. The total length of RJ SH 39 is 318 km. 
Length: 318 km Total length 318 km Satur 
Shahpura,
Gulabpura, 
Bijaynagar,
Mandi Choraya
shivpuraghata 
rawalabadiya 
beawar 50 km from Ajmer 
Ghatii (6 km from beawar)
Choti roopnagar(7 km from beawar)
Roopnagar(9 km from Beawar)
Babra, 21 km from Beawar
Raas, 29 km from Beawar
Lambiya 46 km from Beawar
Merta [82 km from Beawar
Mundwa 110 km from Beawar

See also
 List of State Highways in Rajasthan
 Roads in Pali district

References
 State Highway

Pali district
Bundi district
Bhilwara district
Transport in Ajmer district
Nagaur district
State Highways in Rajasthan